Richard Oliver Gross  (10 January 1882 – 27 December 1964) was a New Zealand farmer and sculptor. He was born in Barrow-in-Furness, Lancashire, England, on 10 January 1882.

Gross sculpted the following works: 
 The figure of Endeavour on the Auckland Grammar School war memorial, Auckland.
 The figure of Sacrifice on the Cambridge war memorial.
 The lion at the base of the Dunedin cenotaph. 
 The fountain at the National War Memorial carillon, Wellington.
 The bronze frieze around the Havelock North memorial.
 The stone frieze on the Auckland War Memorial Museum, Auckland.
 Elements on the Wellington cenotaph including the two panels of a call-to-arms relief and the equestrian figure on top, the ‘Will to Peace’. After the Second World War Gross added the bronze lions to the cenotaph.
 The Athlete and The Swan on the Domain gates, Auckland.
 The marble memorial to the Labour leader Harry Holland, in the Bolton Street cemetery, Wellington. 
 Davis memorial fountain at Mission Bay, Auckland.
 The bronze Maori chief for the One Tree Hill memorial, Auckland.
 The figure of love and justice for the memorial to Michael Joseph Savage at Bastion Point, Auckland.

In the 1938 King's Birthday Honours, Gross was appointed a Companion of the Order of St Michael and St George, in recognition of his services as a sculptor.

References

1882 births
1964 deaths
New Zealand farmers
English emigrants to New Zealand
People from Barrow-in-Furness
20th-century New Zealand sculptors
20th-century New Zealand male artists
New Zealand Companions of the Order of St Michael and St George